Miandoab, Shahin Dezh and Takab (electoral district) is the 2nd electoral district in the West Azerbaijan Province of Iran.  It as a population of 429,860 and elects 2 members of parliament.

1980
MPs in 1980 from the electorate of Miandoab. (1st)
 Mohammad Ali Khosravi 
 Mohsen Raei

1984
MPs in 1984 from the electorate of Miandoab. (2nd)
 Fereydun Saliminia 
 Mohsen Raei

1988
MPs in 1988 from the electorate of Miandoab. (3rd)
 Asadollah Tabe
 Hosein Ali Ziaei

1992
MPs in 1992 from the electorate of Miandoab. (4th)
 Jalal Rasouli 
 Mohsen Raei

1996
MPs in 1996 from the electorate of Miandoab. (5th)
 Jahanbakhsh Mohebbinia 
 Fereydun Saliminia

2000
MPs in 2000 from the electorate of Miandoab, Shahin Dezh and Takab. (6th)
 Jahanbakhsh Mohebbinia 
 Shahbaz Hoseinzadeh

2004
MPs in 2004 from the electorate of Miandoab, Shahin Dezh and Takab. (7th)
 Asadollah Tabe 
 Jahanbakhsh Mohebbinia

2008
MPs in 2008 from the electorate of Miandoab, Shahin Dezh and Takab. (8th)
 Mehdi Isazadeh
 Jahanbakhsh Mohebbinia

2012
MPs in 2012 from the electorate of Miandoab, Shahin Dezh and Takab. (9th)
 Mehdi Isazadeh
 Rohollah Beighi

2016

Notes

References

Electoral districts of West Azerbaijan
Miandoab County
Shahin Dezh County
Takab County
Deputies of Miandoab, Shahin Dezh and Takab